Eric John Fairclough FRCO (4 January 1900 – 1972) was an organist and composer based in England.

Life

He was born in 1900 in Ormskirk, the son of John Fairclough and Clara. He was privately educated and then studied music at the Royal College of Music.

He married Evelyn Anne Guymer.

Appointments

Assistant organist of Peterborough Cathedral 1918 -1925
Organist of Deal Parish Church 1925 - 1930
Organist of Linthorpe Parish Church, Middlesbrough 1930 - 1947
Organist of Bridlington Priory 1947 - 1950
Organist of Burlington Church, Bridlington 1950 - 1955
Organist of St Paul Parish Church, Grange-over-Sands, 1955 - ????

Compositions

He composed organ and church music.

References

1900 births
1972 deaths
English organists
British male organists
Fellows of the Royal College of Organists
People from Ormskirk
20th-century classical musicians
20th-century English composers
20th-century organists
20th-century British male musicians